Menestho albula is a species of sea snail, a marine gastropod mollusk in the family Pyramidellidae, the pyrams, and their allies.

Description
The species' shell size varies between 4 mm and 9 mm. The white shell has a corpulent shape. The whorls of the teleoconch are slightly convex, with numerous spiral lines.

Distribution
This species occurs in the following locations:
 Cobscook Bay
 European waters (ERMS scope)
 Gulf of Maine
 North West Atlantic (from Labrador to Greenland)

Notes
Additional information regarding this species:
 Distribution: Greenland to Cobscook Bay
 Habitat: infralittoral of the Gulf and estuary

References

External links
 To Biodiversity Heritage Library (43 publications)
 To CLEMAM
 To Encyclopedia of Life
 To ITIS
 To World Register of Marine Species
 

Pyramidellidae
Gastropods described in 1780